Selçuk Yaşar is a light-rail station on the Karşıyaka Tram line of the Tram İzmir network. The station consists of an island platform serving two tracks. Selçuk Yaşar is located on Selçuk Yaşar Street in Atakent, Karşıyaka. The station was opened on 11 April 2017, along with the entire tram line.

References

External links
Tram İzmir - official website

Railway stations opened in 2017
2017 establishments in Turkey
Karşıyaka District
Tram transport in İzmir